The Miracle at the New Meadowlands, also called "New Miracle at the New Meadowlands" and "Miracle at the Meadowlands II" was an improbable come-from-behind win by the Philadelphia Eagles over rival team the New York Giants at New Meadowlands Stadium on December 19, 2010. The game was a crucial one in the context of the season, played between two divisional rivals in Week 15 of the 2010 NFL season. With just over eight minutes to play in the fourth quarter, the Eagles trailed the Giants by 21 points. They went on to score four unanswered touchdowns in the final seven minutes and 28 seconds of play, including a punt returned for a touchdown by DeSean Jackson as time expired. Jackson became the first player in NFL history to win a game by scoring on a punt return as time expired. The win allowed the Eagles to progress to the 2010 NFL playoffs by head-to-head tiebreaker over the Giants, where they lost to the eventual Super Bowl champion Green Bay Packers. The Giants did not qualify for the playoffs despite achieving a 10–6 record.

The game was ranked No. 1 of the 2010 NFL regular season by the NFL, and on April 9, 2013, NFL.com readers voted Jackson's game-winning punt return the greatest play of all time.

This game is also known as "The Punt" by Giants fans, in a similar way that the Miracle at the Meadowlands is known as "The Fumble".

Game summary

First quarter
The Giants won the toss and chose to receive, but their first possession resulted in a punt after going three-and-out.
The Eagles offense took the field for the first time, with the ball spotted at their own 29-yard line. After an incomplete pass, quarterback Michael Vick threw a pass intended for wide receiver DeSean Jackson, but it was picked off by cornerback Corey Webster who returned it to the Eagles 42-yard line. The Giants were unable to capitalize on the turnover, as linebacker Moise Fokou sacked quarterback Eli Manning putting them out of field goal range and forcing them to punt. After the Eagles failed to get anything going on the ensuing drive, the Giants put together a 71-yard scoring drive that ended with Manning finding wide receiver Mario Manningham for a 35-yard touchdown pass to put the Giants on the board, leading 7–0. Near the end of the quarter, safety Quintin Mikell picked off Manning's pass to wide receiver Derek Hagan and ran it back to the Giants 45-yard line. The final play of the first quarter resulted in a run by Vick for 11 yards and a personal foul called on tackle Jonathan Goff which moved the ball to the Giants 19-yard line.

Second quarter
The Eagles' drive carried over from the previous quarter. A completed pass and a run moved the Eagles to the 12-yard line. But on third down, Vick was sacked for a 4-yard loss by defensive tackle Rocky Bernard, forcing the Eagles to settle for a 34-yard field goal from kicker David Akers. The Giants received the ball and started at their own 21-yard line, whereupon they put together an 8-play, 79-yard drive. Running back Ahmad Bradshaw ran three times for 24 yards. The drive ended on Manning's second touchdown pass to Manningham, this one for 33 yards putting the Giants in the driver's seat, 14–3. The Giants once again stopped the Eagles on their next drive and received the ball. Two passes to Hagan for 27 yards and 11-yard run by Bradshaw helped the Giants get to the Eagles 7-yard line. The Giants were unable to score on third down because of an incomplete pass to tight end Kevin Boss. The Giants settled for a 25-yard field goal from kicker Lawrence Tynes to make the score 17–3. The Eagles tried to get something going on the next drive and it appeared they did when Vick found wide receiver Jeremy Maclin, but the ball came loose before he hit the ground. Safety Kenny Phillips recovered it and ran it to the Eagles 8-yard line. The Eagles called a timeout to try to get the replay assistant to take a look at the play since it was now under two minutes in the half, but the play was reviewed and it was determined to be a fumble. The Giants took advantage of this and on the next play, Manning found wide receiver Hakeem Nicks for an 8-yard touchdown pass putting the Giants in total control at halftime 24–3.

Third quarter
After the first drives of the quarter by both teams failed, the Eagles received the ball and tried to drive downfield. They got to the Giants' 42 before two costly penalties on tight end Brent Celek forced them to punt. On the next drive, Manning found Manningham but the ball came loose and defensive tackle Mike Patterson recovered it for the Eagles on the Giants 25-yard line. After a run and a pass, Vick threw an 8-yard touchdown pass to Maclin to make the score 24–10 and keep the Eagles in the game.

Fourth quarter
Both teams punted once in the opening minutes of the fourth quarter, giving the Eagles the ball with 12:48 remaining in the game. With first down at the 20-yard line, Vick dropped back and passed to Jackson, who advanced to the Eagles' 49-yard line before losing the football as he hit the ground. The Giants' Kenny Phillips picked up the loose ball and advanced it to the Eagles' 47-yard line. Replays showed that linebacker Jonathan Goff touched Jackson's jersey as he was falling, meaning that the call on the field of a fumble was incorrect. However, Eagles head coach Andy Reid neglected to challenge the call on the field and the Giants took possession. On third down and 4 from the Eagles' 8-yard line, Manning hit Boss in the back of the end zone to give the Giants a 31–10 lead with 8:17 remaining in the game.

Prior to the ensuing kickoff, the Giants stadium public address system played the Eagles' fight song, "Eye of the Tiger" as a means of mocking the Eagles.

After opening up the next drive with a pass to Maclin that brought the Eagles to their own 35-yard line, Vick dropped back and completed a pass downfield to Celek, who blew by a missed tackle from Phillips and made his way into the end zone for a 65-yard touchdown that brought the score to 31–17 with 7:28 left in the game.

On the ensuing kickoff, after both teams lined up in regular kickoff formations, Akers placed an onside kick on the left side of the field, which was caught by wide receiver Riley Cooper and advanced to the Eagles' 43-yard line. Particularly noteworthy about the play was the fact that the Eagles only had 10 men on the field – four to Akers' right and five to his left – and that the Giants' front line of blockers on the return was lined up 15 yards away from the tee, rather than the usual 10. It was unclear whether the Eagles intentionally had only 10 men on the field, as Giants special teams captain Chase Blackburn stated after the game that he believed it was on purpose. On the second play of the ensuing drive, Vick escaped a New York blitz and rushed all the way down to the Giants' six-yard line. After two incomplete passes, with an offsides on Tuck in between, Vick ran the ball into the end zone on third and goal from the four-yard line, making the score 31–24 with 5:28 left in the game.

A short kickoff by Akers and a good runback by return man DJ Ware gave the Giants the ball on their own 35-yard line, and a pass from Manning to Manningham and three straight runs by Bradshaw gave the Giants two first downs, forcing the Eagles to use all three of their timeouts. However, on second and six from the Eagles 38-yard line, tackle David Diehl committed a false start penalty, backing the Giants up to second and 11. A three-yard run by Bradshaw and an incomplete pass by Manning on third down left the Giants just outside Tynes' range for a field goal and forced the Giants to punt. The ensuing fair catch by Maclin gave the Eagles the ball at their own 12-yard line with 3:01 remaining in the game.

After two incomplete passes to begin the drive, Vick escaped a blitz by scrambling to his left for 33 yards before stepping out of bounds at the Eagles' 45-yard line. A pass to Avant and another scramble by Vick set the Eagles up at the 20-yard line at the two-minute warning. Facing second and three from the 13-yard line, Vick passed to Maclin on the left side, and Maclin shook a tackle from cornerback Terrell Thomas and reached the end zone, tying the game at 31–31 with 1:16 remaining.

Once again, Akers' kick and Ware's return placed the Giants in good field position, with Manning beginning the drive at the Giants 36-yard line with 1:10 left. However, the drive began with two incomplete passes, and after a third-down sack by defensive tackle Trevor Laws put the Giants at their own 29-yard line, the Giants called a timeout as the play clock was about to expire on fourth down with 12 seconds left. Officials then ruled to reset the game clock to 14 seconds as the Giants' punt team and the Eagles' punt return team came onto the field.

The play
The snap from long snapper Zak DeOssie to punter Matt Dodge was high, and Dodge hastily kicked a line drive punt to Jackson rather than kicking the ball out of bounds. Jackson received the ball at the Eagles 35-yard line and immediately muffed the catch before picking the ball up and backpedaling to the 30-yard line. (This was later claimed by some to cause the Giants' coverage to collapse, ironically assisting Jackson.) Jackson ran through a group of Giants and made it to midfield before receiving a huge block by wide receiver Jason Avant on DeOssie, leaving no one in front of Jackson on the way to the end zone (Avant actually gave himself a concussion on the block, and both players were left lying on the field for the rest of the play). Ware followed Jackson but could not catch him. After the clock hit 0:00, Jackson ran parallel to the goal line across most of the width of the field—according to Jackson after the game, because he wanted to be sure the clock had expired, though some observers believed it to be due to his showboating nature – before advancing into the end zone for the game-winning touchdown. With no flags on the field, Jackson threw the ball into the New Meadowlands stands in celebration as the team gathered around him near the end zone. Giants head coach Tom Coughlin was so livid he threw his play sheet and notes onto the ground and ran onto the field before Jackson even reached the end zone, yelling at Dodge for not punting the ball out of bounds. Per NFL rules at the time, Akers came out to kick the extra point and the Eagles won the game 38–31.

Scoring summary

Calls on the last play

Statistics

Individual leaders

*Completions/Attempts
aCarries
bLong play
cReceptions
tTackles
gForced Fumble

Starting lineups

Game time and weather conditions
 Kickoff was at 1:03 p.m. EST (18:03 UTC).
 Game length was 3 hrs. 16 min.

Aftermath
The win allowed the Atlanta Falcons, who would beat the Seattle Seahawks 34–18 later that day, to clinch a playoff spot.

The day after, newspapers in New York had pictures of Eli Manning and other players on the Giants following the epic collapse on their covers. New York Post put on the front page cover, "GIANTS DOG IT Epic Collapse against Vick and the Eagles", in reference to Vick's conviction for participating in an illegal dog-fighting ring. The Post also printed a photo of Eagles quarterback Michael Vick and two dogs superimposed on Giants players' faces behind him. It was also discussed on morning news shows, including American Morning. Commentators in both New York and Philadelphia also held up the morning newspapers in their cities, both of which had the headline about the Eagles beating the Giants.

The result of the game would ultimately help decide the division for the Eagles. In the following week, the Green Bay Packers defeated the Giants, 45–17, enabling Philadelphia to clinch the NFC East division title. Though the Giants won their week 17 matchup against the Washington Redskins, they failed to qualify for the playoffs since the Packers, who also finished the season at 10–6, won the tiebreaker,  and went on to win Super Bowl XLV.

By the end of the season, Matt Dodge was released from the Giants as the team signed former New York Jet Steve Weatherford to take his place the following season. The Giants would struggle to a 9–7 record in 2011, yet qualify for the playoffs as the NFC's #4 seed by virtue of winning the NFC East division and would eventually win Super Bowl XLVI.

See also
 Eagles–Giants rivalry
 Miracle at the Meadowlands

References

External links
 Video of the play from NFL.com
 

National Football League games
American football incidents
New York Giants
Philadelphia Eagles
2010 National Football League season
2010 in sports in New Jersey
Sports competitions in East Rutherford, New Jersey
December 2010 sports events in the United States
21st century in East Rutherford, New Jersey